The chestnut-backed sparrow-weaver (Plocepasser rufoscapulatus) is a species of bird in the family Ploceidae.

It is found in southern Africa from Angola and southern Democratic Republic of Congo to Zambia and Malawi.

References

External links
 Chestnut-mantled Sparrow-Weaver, or Chestnut-backed Sparrow-Weaver -  Species text in Weaver Watch.

Plocepasser
Birds described in 1888
Taxa named by Johann Büttikofer
Taxonomy articles created by Polbot